Erie Public Library may refer to:

Buffalo & Erie County Public Library, in New York
Libraries of the Erie County library system, in Erie, Pennsylvania
Main Library (Erie, Pennsylvania), in Erie, Pennsylvania